Dominique Van Roost was the defending champion but lost in the final 6–3, 6–2 against Patty Schnyder.

Seeds
A champion seed is indicated in bold text while text in italics indicates the round in which that seed was eliminated.

  Dominique Van Roost (final)
  Patty Schnyder (champion)
  Joannette Kruger (semifinals)
  Naoko Sawamatsu (second round)
  Henrieta Nagyová (quarterfinals)
  Anne-Gaëlle Sidot (quarterfinals)
  Barbara Schett (quarterfinals)
  Elena Likhovtseva (first round)

Draw

References

External links
 1998 ANZ Tasmanian International Draw

Hobart International – Singles
Singles